Marvin Wachman (March 24, 1917 – December 22, 2007), a professor of American history, was president of Lincoln University and Temple University, and served as interim president of Albright College and the Philadelphia College of Textiles and Science.

Early life and education

Born in Milwaukee, Wisconsin, Marvin Wachman was the son of immigrants from Riga, Latvia, and Minsk, presently in Belarus.  He attended Northwestern University in Chicago, where he earned bachelor's and master's degrees in history.  He received his Ph.D. in history from the University of Illinois.

University career

Wachman taught history for fourteen years at Colgate University, and was director of the Salzburg Seminar in Austria for two years.  In 1961 he was asked to become president of Lincoln University, an historically black institution, which was having financial and accreditation problems.  He hired new faculty, increased enrollment, and raised money to reestablish the university's academic standing.  In 1969 he was appointed vice president for academic affairs at Temple University, and in 1973 became president.  During his tenure he founded new campuses in Tokyo, Japan, and in the Center City of Philadelphia.  He retired in 1983, and served as president of the Foreign Policy Research Institute in Philadelphia from 1983 to 1989.  During the 1990s he served as interim president of Albright College in Reading, Pennsylvania, and the Philadelphia College of Textiles and Science, now known as Philadelphia University.

Wachman was the author of History of the Social-Democratic Party of Milwaukee, 1897-1910 (Urbana: University of Illinois Press, 1945).  He published a memoir, The Education of a University President (Temple University Press), in 2005.

References

 

Presidents of Temple University
Albright College faculty
Thomas Jefferson University
Northwestern University alumni
University of Illinois Urbana-Champaign alumni
Presidents of Lincoln University (Pennsylvania)
Colgate University faculty
1917 births
2007 deaths
American people of Belarusian-Jewish descent
20th-century American academics